Walpole Park is a  Grade II municipal park, situated in Ealing (West London). Currently governed by Ealing Council, it was initially the grounds of Pitzhanger Manor, the early 19th-century country home of Sir John Soane. It was acquired by Ealing Council in 1899 and opened to the public for the first time on 1 May 1901. 

The park itself is listed at grade II on the Register of Parks and Gardens of Special Historic Interest in England. Within its boundaries are additional statutory protected structures: Pitzhanger Manor & Gallery (listed Grade I) and Lodge (listed Grade II). Other attractions featured in its grounds include the late Victorian ornamental Serpentine Lake, bordering the House's rear lawn, and a pond further west with a pair of fountains – both of which attract waterfowl.

History
Pitzhanger Manor and its grounds (later Walpole Park) was once owned by the influential British architect, Sir John Soane, who bought it in 1800. During 1800 to 1803, Soane transformed Pitzhanger Manor's architecture and hired landscape gardener, John Haverfield to transform its grounds. Its ownership changed hands several times after Soane sold it in 1810. Eventually it was purchased for £40,000 in 1899 by the Urban District Council of Ealing from Sir Spencer Walpole, having previously been bought by his father, the Rt. Hon. Spencer Horatio Walpole. The Borough surveyor Charles Jones who negotiated the terms of the sale with his close friend Spencer Walpole also went on to set out the design of tree-lined avenues, paths and flower beds. The outer path is  nearly a mile in circumference. The sides of the pond nearest Pitzhanger Manor were planted with shrubs and other plants. 

Soane's Manor then became Ealing Borough's central public lending library. The library vacated the site in 1984. Work then began on researching the building to discover the original décor and renovating it back to how it had been in Soane's day. A library extension that had been built on the north-side was converted into the present-day art gallery.

At the end of the 1980s some restoration work was done to recreate some of the original layout by Soane's and Haverfield's garden. In 1987 it was registered by English Heritage on the Register of Parks and Gardens of Special Historic Interest in England.

The park was extensively renovated from August 2013 on-wards and reopened fully in the summer of 2014. Two new ponds replaced the ornamental lake and the fishpond. Breeding wildfowl have returned to the park and the new flower beds are developing, with Regency planting. The bridge which was situated at one end of the sunken garden has been restored.

Features

Boundary Wall 
Walpole Park's north boundary wall likely dates from the late-18th century and a Grade II listing. Facing Mattock Lane, the red-brick wall is 10 feet high and spans 50 yards of the park's northern perimeter, from Walpole's entrance arch to the public conveniences.

Gates 
Pitzhanger Manor's archway was originally produced by John Soane as his Manor's entrance, and is now in use as the park's main entryway. A Grade I listing, the arch is still made of the original brick and flint materials used by Soane. It is located horizontal to Pitzhanger's front-face at the north-east end of Walpole Park.

Meters away from the arch is the Ealing War Memorial. This Portland stone entry features as both a park gate and a commemoration of Ealing locals who loss their lives in World War I and World War II.

Buildings 
The neoclassical Pitzhanger Manor & Gallery are located by the main entrance to Walpole Park. The Manor and Gallery's recent renovations from 2015 to 2019 have provided an insight to the intended designs of the Regency Manor in its Regency park - particularly, its reinstated conservatory.

Established in 2015, The Rickyard is a new learning center provided by Ealing Council, located next to the park's playground. It facilities include classroom, park toilets, park staff office and additional support facilities for park maintenance staff. It features a kiosk cafe, Pitzhanger Pantry, as well as houses beehives. 

Acting as the official Pitzhanger cafe, Soane's Kitchen neighbours the Manor.

Parkland 
Most of the park consists of open flat grassed areas bordered by tree lined avenues, which act as wind breaks.

Of the two ponds, the westernmost was the larger of the two and was more formal. It also featured a fountain. The pond nearest to Pitzhanger Manor on the eastward side of the park had sunken sides, which were planted with a mixture of ornamental shrubs and bushes. The pond itself was made to look as though it was a small gently flowing brook. A contemporary drawing of the manor house in the museum suggests that, at the time of Soane, this pond  was much deeper. It was from its sides that John Soane and his friend J. M. W. Turner (the artist) would sit and fish. As the grounds to the west were pastoral it is quite possible that this pond was constructed as a Ha-ha against cattle and sheep. The bridge at the north end, and the pond, were in existence before Soane bought the property but he had it decorated to give an appearance of great antiquity, no doubt to match his faux Roman ruins which he built just to the north of his house. It is a listed Grade II* structure.

Along the north perimeter wall is a large stone bench. This also has a statutory protection of Grade II listed. Next to the bench is a memorial plaque dedicated to Charles Jones, an architect who lived in Ealing, designed Ealing Town Hall, and served as the town's mayor.

Visit

Getting there 
Ealing Broadway is the nearest National Rail and London Underground station to Walpole Park's main entrance, being an 8-minute walk from the site. It is connected by the District and Central line, and 9-minute journey from Paddington station.

South Ealing tube station is the closest on the Piccadilly line, with a 15-minute walk to Walpole's main entry or a 5-minute bus journey (via 65).

There are several London buses which stop within a short walk to Walpole: 65, 207, 427, 607, E1, E11, 112, E2, E7, E8, E9, E10, 483, 226, 297.

In particular, the 65 from Ealing Broadway Station to Ealing Broadway Shopping Centre provides a 2-minute walk to the park's entrance. Likewise, the E2, E7 and E8 from Ealing Broadway Station to Ealing Town Hall all offer a 5-minute walk.

Events
Ealing Summer Festivals host annual events in Walpole Park during the summer months. Its programme features:

Ealing Beer Festival 
 Ealing Comedy Festival
 Ealing Opera in the Park
Ealing Blues Festival
 Ealing Global Festival
 Ealing Jazz Festival

References

Further reading 
 Leary, Emmeline. Pitshanger  Manor: An Introduction. New ed. [Ealing, London]: Ealing Community Services, [1990].Pages 18–27. . The booklet now (early 2008) sold in the Manor as a guide and souvenir. Although the publication is not dated, the short introduction is dated January 1990 and is clearly written for publication.

External links 

Ealing Council | Walpole Park 
Pitzhanger Manor & Gallery Trust | Walpole Park
Coordinates on Wikidata Jestico + Whiles Restoration Project | Walpole Park & The Rickyard

Grade II listed parks and gardens in London
Parks and open spaces in the London Borough of Ealing